Barrens may refer to:

 Pine barrens, a type of ecosystem found in the Northeastern United States
 Pine Barrens (New Jersey), a pine barren in the state of New Jersey
 List of pine barrens which includes some other locations called "Pine Barrens" or "Barrens"
 Serpentine barrens, a grassland or savanna ecosystem in which toxic metals in the soil from minerals of the serpentine group inhibit the growth of many plants
 Urchin barrens, where the proliferation of sea urchins has caused a massive kelp die-off

The Barrens may refer to:
 the Tundra of northern Canada, sometimes specific to the Tundra of Northern Manitoba as referenced in the 1956 book Lost in the Barrens by Farley Mowat. Also called 'Barren Lands'.
 a location in the Warcraft Universe
 a novel by F. Paul Wilson
 a novel by Joyce Carol Oates
 The Barrens (It), a location in the novel It by Stephen King
 The Barrens (film), a 2012 American horror film written and directed by Darren Lynn Bousman and starring Stephen Moyer and Mia Kirshner
 an area in the video game OneShot

See also
 Barren vegetation
 Barren (disambiguation)
 Barren Island (disambiguation)